James Nisbet may refer to:
 James Nisbet (missionary), Scottish-born missionary to Canada
 James Nisbet (minister), Scottish minister of the Church of Scotland
 James Wilke Nisbet, Scottish economist
 Jimmy Nisbet, Scottish footballer 
 James Hume Nisbet, Scottish-born novelist and artist